Center Township is a township in Smith County, Kansas, USA.  As of the 2000 census, its population was 1,827.

Geography 

Demographics 
As of the 2010 census, there were 1,827 people residing in the township. The racial makeup of the township was 97.65% White, 0.11% African American, 0.33% Native American, 0.11% Asian, 0.22% Pacific Islander, 0.33% other races and 1.26% reported that they belonged to two or more races. Hispanic or Latino of any race were 0.93% of the population.

References 

Populated places in Smith County, Kansas
Townships in Kansas